René Piller (born 23 April 1965 in Héricourt, Haute-Saône) is a retired male race walker from France, who competed in three Summer Olympics during his career.

Achievements

References
sports-reference

1965 births
Living people
People from Héricourt, Haute-Saône
French male racewalkers
Olympic athletes of France
Athletes (track and field) at the 1992 Summer Olympics
Athletes (track and field) at the 1996 Summer Olympics
Athletes (track and field) at the 2000 Summer Olympics
Sportspeople from Haute-Saône